LOXSAT is a NASA funded cryogenic fluid management demonstration satellite mission. Eta Space is building the payload.

It is scheduled to launch no earlier than March 2024 on a Rocket Lab Electron launcher.

NASA critical design review is due 15 June 2022.

Mission objectives 
LOXSAT aims to demonstrate on-orbit docking and cryogenic refueling operations using a cryogenic fluid transfer disconnect and latching mechanism developed for depot applications. It will also demonstrate repeated mating/de-mating and the transfer of liquid oxygen.

A LOXSAT2 mission is being defined.

LOXSAT1 will test technology for Eta's orbital depot "CryoDock".

See also 
 Robotic Refueling Mission
 Propellant depot

References 

Technology demonstration satellites
Proposed satellites
2024 in spaceflight
NASA
Cryogenics